Strip farm may refer to:

Strip farming, a method of farming used when a slope is too steep or too long
Ribbon farm, a long, narrow land division, usually found in series lined up along a waterway